Karol Beck and Andrej Martin were the defending champions; however, the latter decided not to participate that year, and Beck is playing alongside Michal Mertiňák instead.

Beck and Mertiňák won the title, defeating Konstantin Kravchuk and Denys Molchanov in the final, 4–6, 7–5, [10–6].

Seeds

Draw

Draw

References
 Main Draw

Trofeo Faip-Perrel - Doubles
2014 Doubles